Culprit (French: Le coupable) is a 1917 French silent drama film directed by André Antoine and starring Romuald Joubé, Sylvie and Jacques Grétillat. It was based on a novel by François Coppée. In 1937, it was remade as a sound film Culprit.

Plot
Chrétien Lescuyer is a prosecuting attorney whose defendant's son commits murder. The son abandons his pregnant mother to fight against a hostile world.

During the hearing, Chrétien Lescuyer talks about his story. Coming from a family of Norman notables, and exercising the profession of magistrate from father to son, the young Christian's father sent him to Paris to complete his law studies. One day, François Donnadieu, a sculptor, a childhood friend, invites him to go to his country house, which is in Vaugirard, to spend Sunday there. It was during this visit that Chrétien met Héloïse, Donnadieu's girlfriend and seamstress by profession, as well as the young Perrinette Forgeat, a florist by profession, with whom he fell in love.

Restoring 
This film was restored in 1987 by the Cinémathèque Française, with the help of the Musée d'Orsay and the participation of the Kodak Pathé foundation. The restoration of the film was possible thanks to the loan of a copy held by the Cinematheque of Prague, in the Czech Republic.

Cast
Romuald Joubé as Chrétien Lescuyer
Sylvie as Louise Rameau
Jacques Grétillat as Prosper Aubry
 as Donadieu - the sculptor
 as Perrinette
Mona Gondré as Chrétien - as a child
 as Grosse Caisse
René Rocher as Chrétien Forgeat

References

External links

French drama films
French silent feature films
1917 drama films
Films directed by André Antoine
French black-and-white films
1910s French-language films
Silent drama films
1910s French films